Anastasia Barzee (born April 24, 1971) is an American actress. Born in Miami, Barzee is a graduate of Frost School of Music.

Career 
Barzee originated the role of Betty Haynes in White Christmas. She also originated the role of Josephine in Napoleon, opposite Paul Baker and Uwe Kröger, and the role of Lady Mortimer in the Broadway production of Henry IV (a combination of Part 1 and Part 2), directed by Jack O'Brien starring Kevin Kline, Audra McDonald, and Dana Ivey.

Barzee was a replacement in the Broadway production of Jekyll & Hyde, as Emma Carew. She starred from January 1999 until January 2000 opposite Rob Evan and Luba Mason. She also appeared as Hope in Urinetown (immediately following her stint in Napoleon) and also as Ellen in Miss Saigon. She was also in the Los Angeles cast and national tours of both City of Angels and Sunset Boulevard. 

Barzee has appeared on television in shows including Law & Order: Special Victims Unit, Law & Order, Get a Life, Murder She Wrote, Designing Women and Herman's Head. She appeared in the 2010 feature film Fair Game, opposite Sean Penn, directed by Doug Liman.

She can be heard on the cast recordings of Napoleon (Original London Cast) and the White Christmas World Premiere Stage Recording.

Filmography

Film

Television

References

External links
Anastasia Barzee Website

Napoleon Soundtrack

1971 births
Living people
American film actresses
American musical theatre actresses
American television actresses
Actresses from Miami
University of Miami Frost School of Music alumni
21st-century American women